Nguyễn Thị Thập (Châu Thành, 10 October 1908 – 1996) was a Vietnamese revolutionary and politician. She was a deputy to the National Assembly and President of the Vietnam Women's Union, the oldest (1956–1974). She is also the first woman State Vietnam awarded the Gold Star Medal in 1985.

Biography
Nguyễn Thị Thập was born Nguyễn Thị Ngọc Tốt on October 10, 1908, in xã Long Hưng, huyện Châu Thành, in the then Mỹ Tho Province (today Tiền Giang Province). Since age 20, she became enlightened revolutionary ideal, participation and Agriculture organization at home. In 1931 she joined the Communist Party of Indochina (Đảng Cộng sản Đông Dương). From there she took the alias Mười Thập or Nguyễn Thị Thập. Then escape movements, construction of Mỹ Tho, Tân An, Bến Tre, Saigo. On 4 March 1935 she was elected to the Party Committee of the South. May 1935, she was arrested by the French, sentenced to prison. End of her term, her home secretly engaged in revolutionary activities. After the tax farmers protest leaders in Long Hung Commune, she was arrested again, but the people of Long Hung, Long Dinh pull to release her.

In 1940, women in leadership Cochinchina uprising in Mỹ Tho Province. Her husband is also a soldier in a French prison in Côn Đảo in 1930, just about to join the uprising. After uprising, khởi nghĩa Nam Kỳ, her husband was arrested (January 1941) by the French and executed. In 1945 she joined leaders to seize power in Mỹ Tho Province. In 1946 she was elected a delegate to the first National Assembly of Vietnam Democratic Republic.

During 9 years of war against the French, she was appointed as Secretary of the Party Group Southern women, the Women's Head of the South. After practicing for the North (1954), she was elected President of the Vietnam Women's Union (1956–1974). In 1955, she was elected to the Central Committee of the Vietnam Workers' Party until retirement (1980). She was assigned by the Party and State of Vietnam many important positions: Secretary of the Party Group of women cum Head of the spare carrier Party Central Committee (Trưởng ban phụ vận Trung ương Đảng).

Continuously from the khóa I to khóa VI, she was elected to the National Assembly and the Vice President of the National Assembly from the khóa II to khóa VI. She was awarded the Gold Star Order (Sao vàng) - the highest medal of the State of Vietnam and Vietnamese mother title hero.

She died on March 19, 1996, in Ho Chi Minh City. She was buried in the cemetery of martyrs of Tiền Giang Province (Nghĩa trang liệt sỹ tỉnh Tiền Giang), next to the grave of her husband.

References

1908 births
1996 deaths
Vietnamese politicians
People from Tiền Giang province
Alternates of the 2nd Central Committee of the Workers' Party of Vietnam
Members of the 2nd Central Committee of the Workers' Party of Vietnam
Members of the 3rd Central Committee of the Workers' Party of Vietnam
Members of the 4th Central Committee of the Communist Party of Vietnam
20th-century Vietnamese women politicians
20th-century Vietnamese politicians